Act. 1 The Little Mermaid is the debut extended play by South Korean girl group Gugudan. It was released digitally and physically on June 28, 2016 by Jellyfish Entertainment and distributed by CJ E&M.

Background and release
On June 13, 2016, Jellyfish Entertainment launched the band's official website and announced via SNS that the group would debut with the mini-album Act. 1: The Little Mermaid and title-track "Wonderland".

Teasers featuring each of the members for their music video were released from June 14 to 16, 2016. On June 28, the song's music video were released online and through the Naver V App.

The EP was released on June 28, 2016 on Melon and various sites in South Korea and on iTunes for the global market as a digital download.

Promotion
The music video for the title track "Wonderland", was released on June 28, 2016 in conjunction with the EP and accumulates over 2 million views. Gugudan held a live showcase on June 28.

On June 29, the group made their official debut on MBC Music's Show Champion performing "Good Boy" and "Wonderland".

Commercial performance 
Act. 1 The Little Mermaid entered and peaked at number 2 on the South Korean Gaon Album Chart on the chart issue dated June 26 – July 2, 2016. In its third week, the EP re entered the Top 10 at number 8. The EP also charted at number 8 on Gaon Album Chart for the month of June 2016 with 12,839 copies sold.

The title track "Wonderland" entered and peaked at number 38 on the South Korean Gaon Digital Chart on the chart issue dated June 26 – July 2, 2016 with 55,887 downloads sold and 703,642 streams.

Track listing

Charts

Weekly charts

Monthly charts

Release history

References 

Gugudan albums
2016 debut EPs
Korean-language EPs
Jellyfish Entertainment EPs
Fiction about mermaids